Irvingdale is a locality split between the Toowoomba Region and the Western Downs Region, both in Queensland, Australia.

Geography 
Mocattas Corner is a neighbourhood on the north-west boundary of the locality. It takes its name from the former Mocattas Corner railway station, which in turn was named after George Gershon Mocatta, a pastoralist who took up the Cumkillenbar pastoral run in August 1849.

Road infrastructure
The Dalby–Cooyar Road runs along the western boundary. The Dalby - Nungil Road runs through from west to east.

History 
The locality's name is derived from Irvingdale pastoral run established in the 1840s and was located east of Dalby and north of Mount Irving. It is thought that the Irving name refers to pastoralist Clark Irving, who represented the Darling Downs in the New South Wales Legislative Assembly prior to the separation.

In April 1905, the tender of David Cahill of Dalby was accepted to construct a Catholic church in Irvingdale for £200. On Sunday 18 February 1906, Reverend Father Nolan blessed and opened the Sacred Heart Roman Catholic church in Irivingdale. Roman Catholic Archbishop Robert Dunne was to have performed the ceremony, but was unable to attend due to a shortage of priests in Brisbane. 

Edgefield State School opened in February 1916 and closed in April 1924. On 4 November 1946 Edgefield Provisional School opened. In 1949 it became Edgefield State School. It closed in 1960. The school was located at the northern end of Salt Well Road.

Amenities 
Sacred Heart Catholic Church is at 1246 Bowenville Moola Road.

References 

Western Downs Region
Localities in Queensland